Dekina is a local government area in Kogi State, Nigeria.

The northeasterly line of equal latitude and longitude passes through the southeast of the LGA. 
 

The postal code of the area is 272.

References

Further reading
 

Local Government Areas in Kogi State